Peter Steven Ozsváth (born October 20, 1967) is a professor of mathematics at Princeton University.  He created, along with Zoltán Szabó, Heegaard Floer homology, a homology theory for 3-manifolds.

Education
Ozsváth received his Ph.D. from Princeton in 1994 under the supervision of John Morgan; his dissertation was entitled On Blowup Formulas For SU(2) Donaldson Polynomials.

Awards

In 2007, Ozsváth was one of the recipients of the Oswald Veblen Prize in Geometry. In 2008 he was named a Guggenheim Fellow. In July 2017, he was a plenary lecturer in the Mathematical Congress of the Americas. He was elected a member of the National Academy of Sciences in 2018.

Selected publications

Grid Homology for Knots and Links, American Math Society, (2015)

References

External links
Personal homepage

Living people
1967 births
20th-century American mathematicians
20th-century Hungarian mathematicians
21st-century American mathematicians
21st-century Hungarian mathematicians
Princeton University faculty
Columbia University faculty
Topologists
Mathematicians from Texas
People from Dallas
Princeton University alumni
Members of the United States National Academy of Sciences